Hans Heinrich Bürmann (died 21 June 1817, in Mannheim) was a German mathematician and teacher. He ran an "academy of commerce" in Mannheim since 1795 where he used to teach mathematics. He also served as a censor in Mannheim. He was nominated Headmaster of the Commerce Academy of the Grand Duchy of Baden in 1811. He did scientific research in the area of combinatorics and he contributed to the development of the symbolic language of mathematics. He discovered the generalized form of the Lagrange inversion theorem. He corresponded and published with Joseph Louis Lagrange and Carl Hindenburg.

Iterate function composition notation
The compositional notation  for the n-th iterate of function  was originally introduced by Bürmann and later independently suggested by John Frederick William Herschel in 1813.

See also
Bürmann series
Lagrange–Bürmann formula

References

1817 deaths
Year of birth missing
18th-century German mathematicians
19th-century German mathematicians